The 1982 Yamaha International Masters was a non-ranking snooker tournament, that was held between 1 and 7 March 1982 at the Assembly Rooms in Derby, England.
 


Main draw

Group 1

Group 2

Group 3

Group 4

Semi-final Group 1

Semi-final Group 2

Final

Qualifying

Group 1

Group 2

Group 3

Group 4

References

British Open (snooker)
International Masters
International Masters
International Masters